The 2003 Lower Saxony state election was held on 2 February 2003 to elect the members of the 15th Landtag of Lower Saxony. The incumbent Social Democratic Party (SPD) majority government led by Minister-President Sigmar Gabriel was defeated. The Christian Democratic Union (CDU) came up one seat short of a majority, and formed a coalition with the Free Democratic Party (FDP). CDU leader Christian Wulff was subsequently elected minister-president.

Background
The election in Lower Saxony had larger significance than just in the state itself. Defeat for the Social Democrats in the election would mean they lost their slim majority in the upper house of the German parliament, the Bundesrat. It was thought this might cause the collapse of Gerhard Schröder's national coalition government between the Social Democrats and the Green Party.

Campaign and issues
The economy was seen as the most important issue in the election, with the Social Democrats suffering as a result.

Opinion polls in December 2002 showed the Christian Democrats in the lead with 43% as against 34% for the Social Democrats.

Parties
The table below lists parties represented in the 14th Landtag of Lower Saxony.

Opinion polling

Election result

|-
! colspan="2" | Party
! Votes
! %
! +/-
! Seats 
! +/-
! Seats %
|-
| bgcolor=| 
| align=left | Christian Democratic Union (CDU)
| align=right| 1,925,055
| align=right| 48.3
| align=right| 12.4
| align=right| 91
| align=right| 29
| align=right| 49.7
|-
| bgcolor=| 
| align=left | Social Democratic Party (SPD)
| align=right| 1,330,156
| align=right| 33.4
| align=right| 14.5
| align=right| 63
| align=right| 20
| align=right| 34.4
|-
| bgcolor=| 
| align=left | Free Democratic Party (FDP)
| align=right| 323,107
| align=right| 8.1
| align=right| 3.2
| align=right| 15
| align=right| 15
| align=right| 8.2
|-
| bgcolor=| 
| align=left | Alliance 90/The Greens (Grüne)
| align=right| 304,532
| align=right| 7.6
| align=right| 0.6
| align=right| 14
| align=right| 2
| align=right| 7.7
|-
! colspan=8|
|-
| bgcolor=#63B8FF|
| align=left | Party for a Rule of Law Offensive (Schill party)
| align=right| 40,342
| align=right| 1.0
| align=right| New
| align=right| 0
| align=right| New
| align=right| 0
|-
| bgcolor=| 
| align=left | Party of Democratic Socialism (PDS)
| align=right| 21,560
| align=right| 0.5
| align=right| 0.5
| align=right| 0
| align=right| ±0
| align=right| 0
|-
| bgcolor=|
| align=left | Others
| align=right| 39,257
| align=right| 1.0
| align=right| 
| align=right| 0
| align=right| ±0
| align=right| 0
|-
! align=right colspan=2| Total
! align=right| 3,984,009
! align=right| 100.0
! align=right| 
! align=right| 183
! align=right| 26
! align=right| 
|-
! align=right colspan=2| Voter turnout
! align=right| 
! align=right| 67.0
! align=right| 6.8
! align=right| 
! align=right| 
! align=right| 
|}

References

2003 elections in Germany
2003
February 2003 events in Europe